Mary Hood (born September 16, 1946 in Brunswick, Georgia) is a fiction writer of predominantly Southern literature, who has authored three short story collections – How Far She Went, And Venus is Blue and A Clear View of the Southern Sky – two novellas – And Venus is Blue (also the title of her second short story collection) and Seam Busters – and a novel, Familiar Heat. She also regularly publishes essays and reviews in literary and popular magazines.

Hood was inducted into the Georgia Writers Hall of Fame in 2014.

Family and home
Mary Hood was born in Brunswick, Georgia, on September 16, 1946, to William Charles Hood and Mary Adella Katherine Rogers Hood.

Hood's father was an aircraft worker, originally from Manhattan, New York.  Her mother was a Latin teacher, originally from rural Cherokee County, Georgia.  The two met during World War II at a United Service Organizations event in Brunswick.

At the age of two, Hood and her family moved from coastal Brunswick to White, Georgia, where they briefly lived with her maternal grandfather, Claude Montgomery Rogers, who was a Methodist minister.  Shortly thereafter, the family moved to Douglas County, and, subsequently, multiple other places across rural north and south Georgia.

Hood graduated from Worth County High School in Sylvester, Georgia, and then moved to Clayton County just outside Atlanta, where she commuted back and forth to Georgia State University.

After obtaining a degree in Spanish and working for two years as a librarian in Douglasville, Georgia, Hood bought land and moved to Cherokee County near Woodstock, Georgia.

Hood lived in Woodstock (in the small lake community of Little Victoria on the banks of Lake Allatoona) for 30 years, where she witnessed the small, rural town turn into a bedroom community for burgeoning Atlanta – much of which is fictionally chronicled in her short story collection And Venus is Blue.

In the early 2000s, she left the now metro-Atlanta-Woodstock area for the quiet countryside of Jackson County, Georgia, where she currently resides.

Awards

 Flannery O'Connor Award for Short Fiction (1984) (How Far She Went)
 The Southern Review /Louisiana State University Short Fiction Award (1984)(How Far She Went)
 National Magazine Award in fiction (1986) "Something Good for Ginnie"
 Lillian Smith Book Award (1987) (And Venus is Blue)
 Dixie Council of Authors and Journalists Author-of-the-Year Award (1987)(And Venus is Blue)
 Townsend Prize for Fiction (1988)(And Venus is Blue)
 Whiting Award (1994)
 Robert Penn Warren Award (2001)
 Townsend Prize for Fiction (2016)(A Clear View of the Southern Sky)

Career
In 1996, she held the Grisham Chair (after John Grisham) at the University of Mississippi, Oxford.  She was the first writer-in-residence at Berry College in 1997–1998, Reinhardt University in 2001 and Oxford College of Emory University in 2009.  Additionally, she was the visiting writer at Centre College in Kentucky in 1999 and has taught classes at the University of Georgia. In the spring of 2010, she held the Ferrol Sams Distinguished Chair of English at Mercer University.

Kennesaw State University in Georgia named her the Writer of the Decade in honor of the tenth anniversary of the Contemporary Literature and Writing Conference.

Identity
Mary Hood has said of Southerners on how they approach identity:

Comparison and praise

Mary Hood's work has been compared to that of Erskine Caldwell, Carson McCullers and Eudora Welty.

The Prince of Tides author Pat Conroy proclaims: "Mary Hood is not a good writer, she is a great writer."

Disambiguation
Mary Hood the fiction writer should not be confused with Dr. Mary Hood, author of the Joyful Home Schooler and other books.  These are two separate individuals.

Hollywood
Mary Hood's work has been tapped by Hollywood – with interest in How Far She Went by Paul Newman, Joanne Woodward and Sydney Pollack.  Additionally, Peter Fonda and Jane Fonda have expressed interest in her fiction.  A screenplay adaptation has been written for her novel Familiar Heat.

Current projects
Mary Hood is working on a novel titled The Other Side of the River.

Selected works

Novels

 Familiar Heat (Knopf, 1995)
 The Other Side of the River (in progress)

Novellas
 And Venus is Blue (Ticknor & Fields, 1986) – title story from the short story collection is the novella
 Seam Busters: A Novella (Story River Books, 2015)

Short story collections
 How Far She Went (University of Georgia Press, 1984)
 And Venus is Blue (Ticknor & Fields, 1986)
 A Clear View of the Southern Sky: Stories – foreword by Pat Conroy (Story River Books, 2015)

Forewords, contributing chapters, published essays
 Rosiebelle Lee Wildcat Tennessee by Raymond Andrews – Foreword by Mary Hood (University of Georgia Press, Reprint, 1988)
 Why Stop? – Essay by Mary Hood (The Gettysburg Review, Winter 1988) (The Best American Essays, 1989)
 The Sacrilege of Alan Kent by Erskine Caldwell – Foreword by Mary Hood, Wood Engravings by Ralph Frizzell (University of Georgia Press, 1995)
 "Tropic of Conscience," an historical essay on Northwest Georgia for The New Georgia Guide (University of Georgia Press 1996)

Anthologies containing work
 The Best American Essays (1989)
 Best American Short Stories
 Stories: Contemporary Southern Short Fiction edited by Donald Hays (1989)
 Editor's Choice
 Georgia Voices: Fiction edited by Hugh Ruppersburg (1992)
 Homeplaces: Stories of the South by Women Writers edited by Mary Ellis Gibson (1991)
 The Literary Dog: Great Contemporary Dog Stories edited by Jeanne Schinto (1990)
 New Stories from the South
 The Pushcart Prize Anthology
 Writing Fiction: A Guide to Narrative Craft by Janet Burroway (1992, 3rd ed.)

Magazines featuring Hood's prose
 Art & Antiques
 Gray's Sporting Journal: The Bird Hunting Book (August 2000) with Clyde Edgerton, O. Victor Miller, Bailey White and John Yow
 Harper's Magazine
 North American Review
 Southern Magazine

Literary reviews featuring Hood's work
 The Georgia Review
 The Gettysburg Review
 Kenyon Review
 Ohio Review
 Yankee

Interviews
 Wired for Books: Audio Interview with Mary Hood by Don Swaim (1987)
 North Georgia Oral History Series: Interview with Mary Hood by Dede Yow, Thomas A. Scott and Sallie Ellison Loy (Kennesaw State University Oral History Project 1999)

Many of Hood's work has been translated into Dutch, French, Japanese and Swedish.

Reviews
 How Far She Went – briefly noted in The New Yorker 60/49 (January 21, 1985) : 93

References

External links
 The New Georgia Encyclopedia
 PBS River of Song: On Being a Southern Writer
 The Southern Register: Spring 1996
 Southern Writers at Century's End
 Library Thing author profile
 Wired for Books Interview with Don Swaim
 Reinhardt College Release
 The Books – review and praise for Familiar Heat
 pif magazine review of And Venus is Blue
 Centre College Release
 Southern Scribe: A Portrait of Southern Writers by Curt Richter
 Profile at The Whiting Foundation
Stuart A. Rose Manuscript, Archives, and Rare Book Library, Emory University: Mary Hood papers, 1947-1995

1946 births
Living people
American women novelists
Novelists from Georgia (U.S. state)
Georgia State University alumni
People from Brunswick, Georgia
20th-century American novelists
21st-century American novelists
American women short story writers
20th-century American women writers
People from Woodstock, Georgia
People from Jackson County, Georgia
21st-century American women writers
20th-century American short story writers
21st-century American short story writers